Harold Carlyle Parker (26 September 1892 – 30 January 1917) was an Australian rules footballer who played with St Kilda in the Victorian Football League (VFL). He died of wounds received in active service in France in World War I.

Family
The son of Robert Grainger Parker and Eva Parker, he was born in Elsternwick, Victoria on 26 September 1892. He attended Essendon State School. He married Jessie Parker (she remarried after the war and became Mrs. Cumming). At the time of his enlistment, he gave his occupation as warehouseman.

Footballer
During the latter part of the 1911 season, the St. Kilda Football Club and its off-field operations, and its on-field performances were very seriously affected by a players' strike due to protracted disputes with the committee relating to its (mis-)management of club affairs.

Due to the sudden decisions of various played not to play in a particular match, the club used a total of 62 players that season, the most ever used in a single season by a VFL club. This indicates that, given Parker only played towards the end of the season (rounds 9. 13, and 14), he may not have been selected at all if all of the regular players were available.

When measured on his enlistment in the army in 1915, he was 5 ft 9in tall, and weighed 13 stone.

Recruited from the Essendon District Football League, aged 18, Parker played his first senior VFL match for St Kilda, against Collingwood, at Victoria Park on 17 June 1911. He played his second, against Fitzroy, at the Junction Oval, on 15 July 1911.

He played the last of his three VFL senior matches against Melbourne on 22 July, at the Junction Oval. The St Kilda team were so late taking the field that some thought they were not going to play at all. Apart from Wels Eicke, the St Kilda team were hopeless. Heckled, booed, and taunted by the crowd after the match as he was leaving the ground, the St Kilda captain of the day, Harry Lever, had to be restrained from climbing the fence and dealing with the barrackers. Parker's hopes for a fourth match were no doubt dashed by his elementary error of mistaking the behind posts for the goal posts:

Oarsman
He was a well known oarsman, and was a member of the Civil Service Rowing Club.

Military service
Prior to his enlistment on 11 October 1915, Parker had 3½ years experience in the Citizen's Military Force.

Parker was promoted to Second Lieutenant on 21 February 1916.

Death
He was badly wounded in action with the 37th Infantry Battalion of the 3rd Division of the AIF, during a trench raid in France on the night of 29 January 1917, when he was struck in the groin by German machine gun fire.

He was lying in a shell hole, and was too badly wounded to be carried back to the Australian lines. The entire stretcher party that had gone to retrieve him were shot down before they could reach the shell-hole; and, by the time a patrolling party could reach the site, Parker was no longer there.

He was taken prisoner by the Germans, and was admitted to the Bavarian Field Hospital, Lambersart, Lille, France. He died of his wounds in the German hospital the next day.

Remembrance
Buried at the Rue-Petillon Military Cemetery, Fleurbaix, France, Parker is commemorated in a two-panel memorial window installed at St. Johns Uniting Church, at the corner of Mount Alexander Road and Buckley Street, Essendon ("In Loving Memory of Lieut Harold Carlyle Parker, 27th Battln, Died of wounds within the German Lines at Armentieres, 30th Jany 1917, aged 25 years. Thy Will be done".).

See also
 List of Victorian Football League players who died in active service

Footnotes

References
 Group portrait of officers of the 37th Battalion before the Battalion left for France in November 1916, collection of the Australian War Memorial.
 First World War Nominal Roll: Second Lieutenant Harold Carlyle Parker, collection of the Australian War Memorial.
 First World War Service Record: Second Lieutenant Harold Carlyle Parker, National Archives of Australia.
 Australian War Memorial: Red Cross Wounded and Missing Records: Second Lieutenant Harold Carlyle Parker
 Australian War Memorial Roll of Honour: Harold Carlyle Parker

External links
 

1892 births
1917 deaths
Australian rules footballers from Melbourne
St Kilda Football Club players
Australian military personnel killed in World War I
People from Elsternwick, Victoria
Military personnel from Melbourne
Burials in Hauts-de-France